FreeHAL was a volunteer computing project to build a self-learning chatbot. This project is no longer active.

Originally, the program was called JEliza referring to the chatbot ELIZA by Joseph Weizenbaum. The J stood for Java because JEliza has first been programmed in Java. In May 2008, the program has been renamed to FreeHAL because the programming language has changed. The name is related to the computer in the film 2001: A Space Odyssey.

FreeHAL uses a semantic network and technologies like pattern recognition, stemming, part of speech databases and Hidden Markov Models in order to imitate a human behaviour.
FreeHAL learns autonomously. While communicating by keyboard the program extends its database.  Currently, English and German are supported.

By using the BOINC platform, new semantic networks for the program are built. FreeHAL@home appears to have terminated operations.

Awards
In 2008, the program won the first prize in the category "Most Popular" at the Chatterbox Challenge, a yearly competition between different similar chatbots.

Publications
There was an article about FreeHAL in the Linux Magazine, Issue 97 from December 2008. In the German magazine com!, the program was on the CD/DVD and in the list of the Top-10-Open-Source programs of the month.

References

External links
 Website archive
 Linux-Magazine Issue 97, p. 94f
 com! Magazine, Issues 4/08 and 5/08 

 Science in society
Free science software
Volunteer computing projects
Free simulation software
History of artificial intelligence
Chatbots
Software using the GPL license
Free artificial intelligence applications